Cedaria is a small, rather flat trilobite with an oval outline, a headshield and tailshield of approximately the same size, 7 articulating segments in the middle part of the body and spines at the back edges of the headshield that reach halflength of the body. Cedaria lived during the early part of the Upper Cambrian (Dresbachian), and is especially abundant in the Weeks Formation.

Description 
The headshield (or cephalon) is parabolic in shape with a well defined wide, and typically darker colored border of about 10% of the glabellar length or equal to a thorax segment. The well-defined central raised area (or glabella) tapers slightly forward with a rounded front, but lateral furrows are weakly defined. The backward occipital ring is well defined. The distance between the glabella and the border (or preglabellar field) is ±¼ as long as the glabella or 2× the width of the border. The eyes are kidney-shaped, ±¼ as long as the glabella and midlength of the glabella, and close to the glabella (at ⅓ of the width of the glabella). The remaining parts of the cephalon, called fixed and free cheeks (or fixigenae and librigenae) are flat. The fracture lines (or sutures) that in moulting separate the librigenae from the fixigenae are divergent just in front of the eyes, becoming parallel near the border furrow and slightly convergent at margin. From the back of the eyes the sutures bends outward and slightly backward, curving backward at the lateral border furrow and cutting the posterior margin in the inner bend of the spine (or opisthoparian sutures). The articulating middle part of the body (or thorax) has 7 segments, the outer tips bending backwards, pointed and darker. The tailshield (or pygidium) is semicircular, straight or almost indented and has a long, low, tapering axis with 5 or 6 rings, and 4 or 5 pleural furrows. The border in the pygidium is as wide as in the cephalon and is also often  darker, but the border furrow is very shallow or absent.

Taxonomy 
Bonneterrina, Carinamala, Cedaria, Cedarina, Paracedaria, Jimachongia and Vernaculina together comprise the family Cedariidae.

Reassigned species 
 C. buttsi = ?Crepicephalus
 C. woosteri = ?

Distribution 
 C. minor appears in the Upper Cambrian of the United States (between 200 m above the base of the Weeks Formation 15 m into the Big Horse Limestone Member, Orr Formation, House Range, Millard County, Utah), Canada (Rabbitkettle Formation, Mackenzie Mountains), and Greenland.
 Cedaria is also reported in the Warrior Formation in Pennsylvania.

References 

Ptychopariida genera
Cambrian trilobites
Wheeler Shale
Paleozoic life of the Northwest Territories
Paleozoic life of Yukon